Industrialny (masculine), Industrialnaya (feminine), or Industrialnoye (neuter) is the name of several rural localities in Russia:
Industrialny, Krasnodar Krai, a settlement in Kalininsky Rural Okrug under the administrative jurisdiction of the City of Krasnodar, Krasnodar Krai
Industrialny, Rostov Oblast, a settlement in Industrialnoye Rural Settlement of Kasharsky District of Rostov Oblast
Industrialny, Saratov Oblast, a settlement in Yekaterinovsky District of Saratov Oblast
Industrialny, Republic of Tatarstan, a settlement in Aksubayevsky District of the Republic of Tatarstan